Nanohammus subfasciatus is a species of beetle in the family Cerambycidae. It was described by Masaki Matsushita in 1941. It is known from Taiwan and Japan.

References

Lamiini
Beetles described in 1941